Con Poder is the third album released by Salvador. It won the Dove Award at the 35th Annual Gospel Music Awards: Spanish language album of the year.

Track listing
"Alegría"
"Con Poder"
"Palabra"
"Siempre"
"Corazón de Oro"
"Día a la Vez"
"Montaña"
"Ante Tu Presencia"
"Danzo Como David"
"Día a Día"

2003 albums
Salvador (band) albums